Claudia Pandolfi (born 17 November 1974) is an Italian actress.

Life and career
Claudia Pandolfi was born in Rome, the daughter of the CEO of the Laura Biagiotti Fashion House.

Her career began in 1991 on the stage of the Miss Italia beauty contest, in which she reached the semifinals, capturing the attention of Michele Placido who offered her the main role in the drama film Le amiche del cuore.

She reached a large popularity thanks to the television series Amico mio, Un medico in famiglia, Distretto di Polizia, and I liceali.

Filmography

Films

Television

References

External links
 

Italian film actresses
Italian television actresses
1974 births
Actresses from Rome
Living people